Li Wei (Styled Youjie, posthumous name Minda; February 2, 1687 – December 3, 1738) was a Qing dynasty mandarin who lived during the reign of the Yongzheng Emperor (1722–1735). He served the Yongzheng emperor, helped implement his reforms, and held various regional governing positions.

During Yongzheng's reign, Li Wei helped crush Ming dynasty loyalists. Li also implemented a tax reform that was unpopular with landowners.

Biography
Li was a native of Tongshan, Jiangnan (present-day Feng County, Jiangsu), and was orphaned at the age of 10. He was not literate, but practiced martial arts. He entered the Board of Finance as a regular accountant in 1719, then headed a department on the board. He then joined the staff of Prince Yong (the later Yongzheng Emperor). After Yongzheng ascended the throne, Li Wei was named the Governor of Zhejiang in 1727, where he carried out one of Yongzheng's signature policies of taxation reform: transitioning from an individual "head tax" to a land tax. The reform was unpopular with local landowners because it increased their share of taxation owed to the state compared to those owed by landless peasants.

In 1729, in a swift act, Li Wei helped crush Ming Dynasty-loyalists present in the Nanjing area. In 1732, he was appointed the Viceroy of Zhili, overseeing the area immediately outside of Beijing (somewhat analogous to present-day Hebei). Li was a contemporary of Tian Wenjing and Ortai, who were Yongzheng Emperor's most trusted officials. 

In September 1738, while visiting Qinling tombs with the Qianlong Emperor, Li Wei fell ill with a lung infection, and died at the age of 52. The Qianlong Emperor commemorated Li's death.

Li had five sons, all of whom served in the imperial service.

Popular culture
Several TV series are based, albeit very loosely, on the life of Li Wei. The 1998 hit TV series Yongzheng Dynasty depicted Li Wei as a loyal but somewhat devious servant of Yongzheng, who eventually gets promoted to progressively higher positions. In 2000, some members of the cast of Yongzheng Dynasty reunited to produce Li Wei the Magistrate starring Xu Zheng as Li. It was followed by Li Wei the Magistrate II in 2004, also starring Xu, and Li Wei Resigns from Office in 2005, starring Paul Chun as Li. The portrayal of Li Wei as a domestic servant of Yongzheng is largely fictional, as he served in various official roles prior to joining the Prince Yong's staff in the waning years of the Kangxi Emperor's reign. Jacky Wu portrays Li Wei in the 2014 TVB series Gilded Chopsticks where Li is depicted as a household servant to Ko Tin-Bo whom he follows into service of the imperial court. Despite Li being portrayed with drastic differences to his historical counterpart, the historical Li Wei seems to have been the inspiration for another character in the series named Fung Ying who is portrayed by Dickson Lee as a skilled martial artist and associate to then prince Yongzheng who would go on to become Emperor Yongzheng during the series.

External links
Qing Histories: Li Wei

1687 births
1738 deaths
Politicians from Xuzhou
Qing dynasty politicians from Jiangsu
Political office-holders in Zhejiang
Political office-holders in Hebei
Viceroys of Min-Zhe
Viceroys of Zhili